Bambusoceras is a genus of Late/Upper Cambrian nautiloids, member of the Ellesmerocerida and probably Ellesmeroceratidae according to Jack Sepkoski's list of cephalopod genera.

References

External links 
 Sepkoski J.J.2002. List of Cephalopod Genera. 

Prehistoric nautiloid genera
Ellesmerocerida